Suddenly, Last Summer is a 1959 Southern Gothic mystery film based on the 1958 play of the same name by Tennessee Williams. The film was directed by Joseph L. Mankiewicz and produced by Sam Spiegel from a screenplay by Gore Vidal and Williams with cinematography by Jack Hildyard and production design by Oliver Messel. The musical score was composed by Buxton Orr, using themes by Malcolm Arnold.

The plot centers on Catherine Holly, a young woman who, at the insistence of her wealthy aunt, is being evaluated by a psychiatric doctor to receive a lobotomy after witnessing the death of her cousin Sebastian Venable while travelling with him in Spain the previous summer.

The film stars Katharine Hepburn, Elizabeth Taylor and Montgomery Clift with Albert Dekker, Mercedes McCambridge, and Gary Raymond.

Plot 

In 1937 New Orleans, Catherine Holly is a young woman institutionalized for a severe emotional disturbance that occurred when her cousin, Sebastian Venable, died under strange circumstances while they were on summer holiday in Europe. The late Sebastian's wealthy mother, Violet Venable, makes every effort to deny and suppress the potentially sordid truth about her son and his demise. Toward that end, she attempts to bribe the state hospital's administrator, Lawrence J. Hockstader, by offering to finance a new wing for the underfunded facility if he promises that his brilliant young surgeon John Cukrowicz will treat her niece.

Mrs. Venable meets with Dr. Cukrowicz, and their conversation deals rather with Sebastian. Mrs. Venable describes him as a sensitive poet and recounts her travels with him. Catherine has been confined to a private women's mental institution since returning from Europe several months earlier, after suffering a severe shock from the events surrounding Sebastian's death.

Beginning to doubt that Catherine is as deranged as Mrs. Venable claims, Cukrowicz moves Catherine into the state hospital for observation. Catherine's mother, and brother, pay her a visit there and reveal that Mrs. Venable will pay them a large sum of money if they sign papers to commit Catherine to the institution and allow a lobotomy to be performed.

The doctor persuades Mrs. Venable to meet Catherine. In the ensuing confrontation, Catherine tries to get her aunt to reveal Sebastian’s true nature, vaguely hinting that he was homosexual. In a last-ditch effort to help Catherine, Cukrowicz takes her to the Venable estate where he administers a drug that will allow her to overcome any resistance to remembering what happened that summer. Catherine recalls how she and Sebastian spent their days on the beach in the Spanish town of Cabeza de Lobo and reveals that Sebastian was using her to attract young men in order for him to seduce them. Because the boys are desperate for money, Sebastian was successful in his efforts; however, he began to make plans to depart for Northern Europe. One "scorching white-hot day", Sebastian and Catherine were beset by a team of boys begging for money. When Sebastian rejected them, they pursued him through the streets of the town. Sebastian attempted to flee, but the boys swarmed around him at every turn. He was finally cornered among the ruins of a temple on a hilltop. In the meantime, Catherine had been frantically trying to catch up with Sebastian, but she reached him only to see him overwhelmed by the boys. According to Catherine, the boys tore Sebastian apart and ate pieces of his flesh like goblins. Catherine breaks down screaming and crying as she recalls the horror. Violet Venable walks away rambling while mistaking Cukrowicz for Sebastian. As Cukrowicz turns away, the hospital administrator quickly asks if there could be any truth in what Catherine said. Cukrowicz returns outside and calls to Catherine and she turns around and grabs his hand and they walk away.

Cast

 Katharine Hepburn as Violet Venable
 Elizabeth Taylor as Catherine Holly 
 Montgomery Clift as Dr. John Cukrowicz
 Albert Dekker as Dr. Lawrence J. Hockstader
 Mercedes McCambridge as Mrs. Grace Holly
 Gary Raymond as George Holly
 Mavis Villiers as Miss Foxhill
 Patricia Marmont as Nurse Benson
 Joan Young as Sister Felicity
 Maria Britneva as Lucy
 Sheila Robbins as Dr. Hockstader's Secretary
 David Cameron as Young Blonde Intern

Production 

Suddenly, Last Summer is based on a one-act play by Tennessee Williams that originally was paired with Something Unspoken as part of the 1958 off-Broadway double-bill titled Garden District. The work was adapted for the screen by Gore Vidal; though Williams also received credit, he later said that he had nothing to do with the film. Vidal attempted to construct the narrative as a small number of very long scenes, echoing the structure of the play.

Following A Streetcar Named Desire (1951) and Cat on a Hot Tin Roof (1958), Suddenly, Last Summer was the third of Williams' plays to be adapted for the screen that dealt with the subject of homosexuality, although it was far more explicit in its treatment than either of the previous films were allowed to be under the Motion Picture Production Code. Working in conjunction with the National Legion of Decency, the Production Code Administration gave the filmmakers special dispensation to depict Sebastian Venable, declaring "Since the film illustrates the horrors of such a lifestyle, it can be considered moral in theme even though it deals with sexual perversion." Publicity stills of Sebastian were shot – showing him as a handsome, if drawn, man in a white suit – but his face never is seen in the released film. Williams asserted that no actor could portray Sebastian convincingly and that his absence from the screen only made his presence more strongly felt.

Elizabeth Taylor selected Suddenly, Last Summer as her first project after recently ending her contractual commitment to Metro-Goldwyn-Mayer. At the time, she was the biggest box office draw in Hollywood, and she used this power to insist that Montgomery Clift be hired for the film. As a result of a May 1956 car crash near the home of Taylor and her then-husband Michael Wilding, Clift had become heavily dependent on drugs and alcohol. When he was unable to find a doctor willing to attest to his insurability, producer Sam Spiegel approved his casting and went ahead with filming anyway.

Clift found the long scenes exhausting and had to have his longest scene shot in multiple takes, one or two lines at a time. His shaky performance led director Joseph Mankiewicz to ask Spiegel several times to replace the actor. Most of the crew were sympathetic toward Clift, but Katharine Hepburn was especially resentful of the poor treatment to which Mankiewicz subjected him. Indeed, Hepburn found Mankiewicz's conduct so unforgivable that as soon as he called the final "cut" of the film, she asked him to confirm that her services were no longer required, and when he did, she spat in his face. Sources differ as to whether she also spat in Sam Spiegel's face.

Problems beset the film's musical score as well. Malcolm Arnold originally was retained to work on it, but he apparently found certain aspects of the story so disturbing that he withdrew from the project after composing only the main themes. Buxton Orr completed the score.

Taylor, following her final monologue wherein she describes Sebastian's murder, burst into tears and could not be consoled. Using method acting techniques, she had tapped into her grief over the 1958 death of her third husband Mike Todd.

Production on Suddenly, Last Summer took place between May and September 1959. Interior scenes were shot at Shepperton Studios in Surrey, England. The "Cabeza de Lobo" sequence was filmed at Majorca in the Balearic Islands and at Begur, Spain, Castell-Platja d'Aro, Costa Brava, and S'Agaró in Gerona, Spain.

Reception

Critical response 
Contemporary reviews were mixed. Although Hepburn and Taylor received some positive notices for their performances, the film was judged as having suffered for being stretched to feature length and having its content toned down from that of the play.

Bosley Crowther of The New York Times outright panned the film, writing that "the main trouble with this picture is that an idea that is good for not much more than a blackout is stretched to exhausting length and, for all its fine cast and big direction, it is badly, pretentiously played ... Elizabeth Taylor is rightly roiled as the niece, but her wallow in agony at the climax is sheer histrionic showing off. . . Joseph L. Mankiewicz's direction is strained and sluggish, as is, indeed, the whole conceit of the drama. It should have been left to the off-Broadway stage."

Variety called it "possibly the most bizarre film ever made by any major American company," adding, "The film has some very effective moments, but on the whole it fails to move the spectator. Perhaps the reason is that what was a long one-act play has been expanded in the screenplay, by Williams and Gore Vidal, to a longish motion picture. Nothing that's been added is an improvement on the original; the added scenes are merely diversionary."

Harrison's Reports wrote "Aside from the fact that the film will draw curiosity-seekers in droves, the film is a mystery—and the mystery is why Sam Spiegel, a brilliant producer, Joseph L. Mankiewicz, an excellent director, and Columbia, a responsible distributor, even bothered with it in the first place."  John McCarten of The New Yorker called the film "a preposterous and monotonous potpourri of incest, homosexuality, psychiatry, and, so help me, cannibalism."

Richard L. Coe of The Washington Post delivered a mixed review, calling the film "undeniably powerful" and Hepburn "utterly brilliant," but found that "in even trying to fit this analogy of depravity into something approximating our film standards, the whole point is submerged in mists of allusion which only knowledge of the original play can penetrate ... It can be said that the moral is utterly valid, that those we buy and use utterly destroy us, for Mrs. Venable and her wealth are as destroyed as her son and his selfishness. But by framing the statement in so purposely shocking a story and then by not being truly honest about even that, the film too often becomes purposeless, evasive."

The Monthly Film Bulletin wrote that by extending the stage version to feature film length, "the story now sags sufficiently for one to question its credentials, and to realise that its attempt to illuminate the darker corners of the mind is actually nothing more than a slightly infantile fantasy of guilt and masochism." The review also criticized "the spineless box-office ending, which balances Catherine's recovery against a contrived, conventional retreat into madness on the part of Mrs. Venable."

John L. Scott of the Los Angeles Times was more positive, calling the film "an absorbing, in part, shocking motion picture," in which Hepburn and Taylor "pull out all the histrionic stops, resulting in performances that will undoubtedly bring plenty of votes come Oscar-nominating time."

Several people involved with Suddenly, Last Summer later went on to denounce the film. Despite being credited for the screenplay, Tennessee Williams denied having any part in writing it. He thought Elizabeth Taylor was miscast as Catherine, telling Life in 1961 "It stretched my credulity to believe such a 'hip' doll as our Liz wouldn't know at once in the film that she was 'being used for something evil.'" Williams also told The Village Voice in 1973 that Suddenly, Last Summer went too far afield from his original play and "made [him] throw up."

Gore Vidal criticized the ending which had been altered by director Joseph Mankiewicz, adding "We were also not helped by ... those overweight ushers from the Roxy Theatre on Fire Island pretending to be small ravenous boys." Mankiewicz himself blamed the source material, describing the play as "badly constructed ... based on the most elementary Freudian psychology."

Box office 
Suddenly, Last Summer was a hit at the box office, earning $6.4 million in theatrical rentals in the United States and Canada and $9 million worldwide.

Accolades

Notes

References

External links 

 

1959 drama films
1959 films
American drama films
American LGBT-related films
American black-and-white films
Films about cannibalism
Columbia Pictures films
1950s English-language films
Films about psychiatry
American films based on plays
Films directed by Joseph L. Mankiewicz
Films featuring a Best Drama Actress Golden Globe-winning performance
Films produced by Sam Spiegel
Films scored by Malcolm Arnold
Films set in 1937
Films set in country houses
Films set in New Orleans
Films set in Spain
Films shot in England
Films shot in Spain
Films with screenplays by Gore Vidal
Southern Gothic films
Films based on works by Tennessee Williams
1950s LGBT-related films
1950s American films